Reform is an unincorporated community in southeastern Callaway County, Missouri, United States. The community is located at the intersection of Routes CC and O approximately six miles north of Steedman and the Missouri River. The Reform Conservation Area lies just to the south. The Callaway Nuclear Generating Station is located at Reform.

History
A post office called Reform was established in 1853, and remained in operation until 1907. The origin of the name Reform is obscure.

References

Unincorporated communities in Callaway County, Missouri
Unincorporated communities in Missouri
Jefferson City metropolitan area